Sphaerospora is a genus of cnidarians belonging to the family Sphaerosporidae.

The species of this genus are found in Europe and Northern America.

Species

Species:

Sphaerospora abrami 
Sphaerospora araii 
Sphaerospora armatura 
Sphaerospora molnari

References

Sphaerosporidae
Cnidarian genera